Ali Noureddin el-Anezi, or Ali Noureddin al-Unayzi (1904–1983) was a Libyan politician. He had been the first governor of Central Bank of Libya.
Before Libya's independence, he was a member of the "Liberation of Libya" committee. Then, he succeeded in convincing Emile Saint-Lot, Haiti's representative to the United Nations, to vote against , a plan to make the three regions of Libya (Tripolitania, Cyrenaica, Fezzan) under the mandate of three countries (Italy, United Kingdom, France respectively). Saint-Lot's vote was decisive in the plan's refusal.

After independence, he became Minister of Finance (1953–1955), then became the first governor of the central bank of Libya in April 1955, an office he had held to March 1961.

Thereafter, he became an ambassador of Libya to Lebanon, then a minister of petroleum (November 1963–March 1964).

Notes

1904 births
1983 deaths
Ambassadors of Libya to Lebanon
Finance ministers of Libya
Oil ministers of Libya
Governors of the Central Bank of Libya